United Midget Racing Association is a midget car open wheel racing group established in 1961.  The racing association  schedules TQ Midget races for May to October.

Description

UMRA is often used as training ground for young go kart racers to gain open wheel skills before moving on to high level pro-racing formats.  But UMRA racers are not all young: many are long time hobby drivers.

Famous drivers
UMRA was the start of open wheel racing for NASCAR Driver Tony Stewart.

Former UMRA turned pro drivers return to UMRA races for the fun of racing. One such example was in 2000, when Tony Stewart returned to UMRA for a quick race before a Winston Cup test. This was the first time he had raced against his father, Nelson Stewart.

As of 2008 the following eight drivers had United States Auto Club (USAC) and UMRA titles.

Tony Stewart 
 1994 & 1995 USAC National Midget Champion
 1995 USAC National Sprint Champion
 1995 USAC Silver Crown Champion
UMRA feature wins (11)
 7/14/89	Rush Co. Fairgrounds, Rushville, IN
 7/18/89	Jefferson Co. Fairgrounds, Madison, IN
 9/3/89	Decatur Co. Fairgrounds, Greensburg, IN
 9/4/89	Decatur Co. Fairgrounds, Greensburg, IN
 7/14/90	Rush Co. Fairgrounds, Rushville, IN
 7/17/90	Jefferson Co. Fairgrounds, Madison, IN
 8/31/90	Bartholomew Co. Fairgrounds, Columbus, IN
 6/29/91	New Paris Speedway, New Paris, IN
 7/17/91	Decatur Co. Fairgrounds, Greensburg, IN
 7/23/93	Rush Co. Fairgrounds, Rushville, IN
 7/4/96	Rush Co. Fairgrounds, Rushville, IN

Terry Goff 
15 UMRA CHAMPIONSHIPS - 1988, 92,94,95,97,98,99,00,01,03,04,07,08,09,10
1980 UMRA Rookie of the Year
1984 SMRA Runner Up
1987 Florida Fall Shoot-Out Champion
1988, 92,01,03,05,06,08,09,10,11 UMRA Asphalt Champion
1990 USAC Speedrome Midget Rookie of the Year
1992 Milwaukee Winter Classic Midget Champion
1992, 95, 97 UMRA Mechanic of the Year
1993 Florida Winter National Champion
1994 Fair Week Champion
1995, 05 UMRA Rushville Regional Series Champion
2001 UMRA President
2003, 04 Rumble in Ft. Wayne Winner
2004 RCA Rumble in the Dome Winner
UMRA Feature Wins (120)
Florida Feature Wins (15)
USAC Speedrome Feature Wins (10)
SMRA Feature Wins (2)
UMRA 1st in All time Point Standings
UMRA 1st in All Time Point Championships

Tate Martz 
 2004 & 2005 USAC Midwest Ford Focus Champion
 2006 USAC Midwest Pavement Ford Focus Champion
UMRA feature wins (6)
 8/31/06	Ripley Co. Fairgrounds, Osgood, IN
 7/13/07	Bloomington Speedway, Bloomington, IN
 7/20/07	Gas City I-69 Speedway, Gas City, IN
 8/17/07	Vermillion Co. Speedway, Danville, IL
 8/25/07	Mount Lawn Speedway, New Castle, IN
 9/22/07	Mount Lawn Speedway, New Castle, IN

Mike Streicher 
 1991 USAC National Midget Champion
UMRA feature wins (2)
 11/28/85	Salem Civic Center, Salem, VA
 11/29/85	Salem Civic Center, Salem, VA

Duane "Pancho" Carter, Jr.
 1972 USAC National Midget Champion
 1974 & 1976 USAC National Sprint Champion
 1978 USAC Champ Dirt Car Champion
UMRA feature wins (1)
 7/21/70	Salem, IN (not Salem Speedway)

Robby Flock 
 1986, 1989, 1992 & 2002 USAC Western Midget Champion
UMRA feature wins (1)
 7/24/81	Rush Co. Fairgrounds, Rushville, IN

Bobby Michnowicz 
 2006 USAC California Dirt Ford Focus Champion
UMRA feature wins (1)
 7/20/82	Jefferson Co. Fairgrounds, Madison, IN

Gary Howard 
 1989 USAC TQ Midget Champion
UMRA feature wins (1)
 7/12/89	Vermilion Co. Raceway, Danville, IL

Robbie Ray 
 2003 USAC Indiana Ford Focus Champion
 2005 USAC National Ford Focus Champion
UMRA feature wins (1)
 6/30/01	Rush Co. Fairgrounds, Rushville, IN

References

External links 
 UMRA.com

Racing